Samakalika Malayalam Vaarika is a newsweekly and website published by The Express Publications Madurai (P) Ltd, publisher of The New Indian Express daily. The publication, conceived as a newsweekly, is also a leading voice in the cultural and political sphere of Kerala.

History

When the weekly was started in May 1997 veteran journalist S. Jayachandran Nair was at the helm as Editor. He continued in that position until 2012. Currently, it is led by a team headed by its Editor Saji James, with TJS George, a renowned figure both in English and Malayalam journalism is the editorial advisor.

The first issue of the weekly featured a cover story titled "Siamese Irattakal" (Siamese Twins) which stated that the Left and Right political fronts in Kerala are two sides of the same coin when it comes to the issue of corruption. The first issue of weekly was notable on account of the presence of M.P. Narayana Pillai and other eminent writers of the time including Akkitham, OV Vijayan, M. Krishnan Nair, T. Padmanabhan, Malayattoor Ramakrishnan, Ayyappa Panicker and Balachandran Chullikkad. A long interview with O.V. Vijayan done by C. Narayana Menon and a notable chapter from Vijayan's novel 'Madhurangayathi' were included in the first issue. The first issue also featured a comprehensive report titled 'The Curse of Koodankulam' prepared by Ranjith Kumar. The first issue of weekly was released by writer Thakazhi Sivasankara Pillai.

Political Reporting in Kerala

Samakalika Malayalam is known for publishing stories which inspire debate and discussion amongst the politically vibrant society of Kerala. From 2005, when the changes in CPM politics received mass coverage and an increased focus nationally, reports from Samakalika Malayalam emerged as key sources for national, Hindi, and English news outlets. The weekly has faced several lawsuits from politicians and political parties due to its commitment towards accurately reporting news with the goal of a corruption-free political system. The weekly visibly backs social movements including The People's Drive for Development and The Literacy Movement.

Website 
Samakalika Malayalam operates a Malayalam-language website which publishes articles centered around Kerala news, national news, international news, film sports, finance, and general interest.

References

External links
  

Cultural magazines
Literary magazines published in India
Weekly magazines published in India
Magazines with year of establishment missing
Malayalam-language magazines
Year of establishment missing